Frederick Brewer Soden (30 March 1846 – 13 April 1877) was an English cricketer. Soden was a right-handed batsman who bowled right-arm roundarm medium. He was born at Clapham Common, Surrey.

Soden made his first-class debut for Surrey in 1870 against Sussex at The Oval. He made two further first-class appearances the following season, against Sussex at the Royal Brunswick Ground, Hove, and Nottinghamshire at Trent Bridge. He scored a total of 35 runs in his three appearances, at an average of 7.00, with a high score of 7 not out. With the ball, he took 2 wickets at a bowling average of 8.50, with best figures of 1/2.

He died at the place of his birth on 13 April 1877.

References

External links
Frederick Soden at ESPNcricinfo
Frederick Soden at CricketArchive

1846 births
1877 deaths
People from Clapham
English cricketers
Surrey cricketers